Ronny Scholz (born 24 April 1978, in Forst) is a former professional road racing cyclist from Germany who retired after the 2009 season.

Career achievements

Major results

2002
 Internationale Rheinland
2003
 Internationalen Niedersachsen-Rundfahrt, stage 2
 Regio-Tour International, stage 2
2005
 1 Rund um die Nürnberger Altstadt
2006
 Stage 2, Most Active Rider Award, Deutschland Tour

Tour de France Participations 
2004 - 53rd overall
2005 - 91st overall
2006 - 96th overall

External links 
 Ronny Scholz Homepage 
 Bio on Radsport-aktiv.de 

1978 births
Living people
Sportspeople from Forst (Lausitz)
People from Bezirk Cottbus
German male cyclists
Cyclists from Brandenburg